Sukhinichi is a town and the administrative center of Sukhinichsky District in Kaluga Oblast, Russia, a large railway junction on the Moscow – Kyiv line, situated on the Bryn River  southwest of Kaluga, the administrative center of the oblast. Population:

History

The first historical records of the town date from the first half of the 16th century. It was granted town status in 1840. During World War II, Sukhinichi was occupied by the German Army from October 7, 1941 to January 29, 1942. It has grown mainly due to the development of the railway.

Administrative and municipal status

Within the framework of administrative divisions, Sukhinichi serves as the administrative center of Sukhinichsky District, to which it is directly subordinated. As a municipal division, the town of Sukhinichi is incorporated within Sukhinichsky Municipal District as Sukhinichi Urban Settlement.

Climate

References

Notes

Sources

External links
 The murder of the Jews of Sukhinichi during World War II, at Yad Vashem website.

Cities and towns in Kaluga Oblast
Holocaust locations in Russia
Kozelsky Uyezd